Nigga Deep is a compilation album by Sicx and Brotha Lynch Hung, released in 1998.

Track listing

Samples
"Ruff & Rugged" contains a sample of "Hyperbolicsyllabicsesquedalymistic" as performed by Isaac Hayes.
"Ruff & Rugged" also contains samples from More Bounce to the Ounce performed by Zapp and Alwayz Into Somethin' by N.W.A.
"Devils & Gunsmoke" contains a sample from Riding High by Faze-O.
"Raw Edge Bullshit" also contains samples performed by Zapp More Bounce to the Ounce and Dance Floor.
"Raw Edge Bullshit" also contains samples of "So Ruff, So Tuff" performed by Roger Troutman, Flash Light performed by Parliament and Funky Drummer performed by James Brown.
"For the Funk of It" contains a sampled loop from One Nation Under a Groove as performed by Funkadelic.
"For the Funk of It" also contains a sample from "Knucklehead" as performed by Grover Washington Jr.
"Creek Mobb's Loadin' 'Em Up" contains a sample of Nappy Dugout as performed by Funkadelic.
"Crawl Thru the Hood" contains a sample of Harry Manfredini's "Friday the 13th Original Theme".

References

Brotha Lynch Hung albums
Horrorcore albums
1998 compilation albums